Cabaret is a 1972 American musical period drama film directed by Bob Fosse and written for the screen by Jay Presson Allen. It stars Liza Minnelli, Michael York, Helmut Griem, Marisa Berenson, Fritz Wepper and Joel Grey. Set in Berlin during the Weimar Republic in 1931, under the presence of the growing Nazi Party, the film is an adaptation of the 1966 Broadway musical Cabaret by Kander and Ebb, which was based on Christopher Isherwood's semi-autobiographical novel The Berlin Stories (1945) as well as John Van Druten's 1951 play I Am a Camera, which was itself adapted from Isherwood's novel. Multiple numbers from the stage score were used for the film, which also featured three other songs by Kander and Ebb, including two written for the adaptation. 

In the traditional manner of musical theater, most major characters in the stage version sing to express their emotions and advance the plot; in the film, however, the musical numbers are entirely diegetic. All of them take place inside the club, with one exception: "Tomorrow Belongs to Me", the only song sung by neither the Master of Ceremonies nor Sally Bowles.

After the box-office failure of his 1969 film version of Sweet Charity, Fosse bounced back with Cabaret in 1972, a year that made him one of the most honored working directors in Hollywood. The film also brought Minnelli, daughter of Judy Garland and Vincente Minnelli, her own first chance to sing on screen, and she won the Academy Award for Best Actress. With Academy Awards for Best Supporting Actor (Grey), Best Director (Fosse), Best Cinematography, Best Art Direction, Best Sound, Best Original Song Score and Adaptation, and Best Film Editing, Cabaret holds the record for most Oscars earned by a film not honored for Best Picture. It is listed as number 367 on Empires 500 greatest films of all time. Cabaret opened to glowing reviews and strong box office, eventually taking in more than $40 million. In addition to its eight Oscars, it won Best Picture citations from the National Board of Review and the Hollywood Foreign Press Association, and took Best Supporting Actor honors for Grey from the National Board of Review, the Hollywood Foreign Press, and the National Society of Film Critics. In 1995, Cabaret was the twelfth live-action musical film selected by the Library of Congress for preservation in the United States National Film Registry as being deemed "culturally, historically, or aesthetically significant".

Plot 
In 1931 Berlin, a young, openly promiscuous American Sally Bowles performs at the Kit Kat Klub. A new British arrival in the city, Brian Roberts, moves into the boarding house where Sally lives. A reserved academic and writer, Brian must give English lessons to earn a living while completing his doctorate. Sally tries to seduce Brian, but he tells her that on three previous occasions he has tried to have sexual relationships with women, all of which failed. They become friends, and Brian witnesses Sally's bohemian life in the last days of the Weimar Republic. When Brian consoles Sally after her father cancels his meeting with her, they become lovers, concluding that his previous failures with women were because they were "the wrong three girls".

Maximilian von Heune, a rich, married playboy and baron, befriends Sally and takes her and Brian to his country estate where they are both spoiled and courted. After a somewhat enigmatic experience with Brian, Max drops his pursuit of the pair in haste. During an argument, Sally tells Brian that she has been having sex with Max, and Brian reveals that he has as well. Brian and Sally later reconcile, and Sally reveals that Max left them 300 marks and mockingly compares the sum with what a professional prostitute earns.

Sally learns that she is pregnant but is unsure of the father. Brian offers to marry her and take her back to his university life in Cambridge. At first, they celebrate their resolution to start this new life together, but after a picnic between Sally and Brian, in which Brian acts distant and uninterested, Sally becomes disheartened by the vision of herself as a bored faculty wife washing dirty diapers. Ultimately, she has an abortion, without informing Brian in advance. When he confronts her, she shares her fears, and the two reach an understanding. Brian departs for England, and Sally continues her life in Berlin, embedding herself in the Kit Kat Klub.
 
A subplot concerns Fritz Wendel, a German Jew passing as a Protestant, who is in love with Natalia Landauer, a wealthy German Jewish heiress who holds him in contempt and suspects his motives. Through Brian, Sally advises him to be more aggressive, which eventually enables Fritz to win her love. However, to gain her parents' consent for their marriage, Fritz must reveal his background, which he does and the two are married by a rabbi.

The rise of fascism is an ever-present undercurrent throughout the film. Their progress can be tracked through the characters' changing actions and attitudes. While in the beginning of the film, a Nazi is expelled from the Kit Kat Klub, the final shot of the film shows the cabaret's audience is dominated by uniformed Nazis. The rise of the Nazis is also demonstrated in a rural beer garden scene. A blonde boy sings to an audience of all ages ("Tomorrow Belongs to Me") about the beauties of nature and youth. It is revealed that the boy is wearing a Hitler Youth uniform. The ballad transforms into a militant Nazi anthem, and one by one nearly all the adults and young people watching rise and join in the singing. "Do you still think you can control them?" Brian asks Max. Later, Brian's confrontation with a Nazi on a Berlin street leads to his being beaten.

Cast

Historical basis 

The 1972 film was based upon Christopher Isherwood's semi-autobiographical stories about Weimar-era Berlin during the Jazz Age. In 1929, Isherwood moved to Berlin  in order to pursue life as an openly gay man and to enjoy the city's libertine nightlife. His expatriate social circle included W.H. Auden, Stephen Spender, Paul Bowles, and Jean Ross. While in Berlin, Isherwood shared lodgings with Ross, a British cabaret singer and aspiring film actress from a wealthy Anglo-Scottish family.

While rooming together at Nollendorfstrasse 17 in Schöneberg, Isherwood and Ross met John Blomshield, a wealthy playboy who inspired the film character of Baron Maximilian von Heune. Blomshield sexually pursued both Isherwood and Ross for a short while, and he invited them to accompany him on a trip abroad. He then abruptly disappeared without saying goodbye. Following Blomshield's disappearance, Ross became pregnant with the child of jazz pianist and later actor Peter van Eyck. After Eyck abandoned Ross, she underwent a near-fatal abortion facilitated by Isherwood who pretended to be her heterosexual impregnator.

While Ross recovered from the botched abortion procedure, the political situation rapidly deteriorated in Germany. As Berlin's daily scenes featured "poverty, unemployment, political demonstrations and street fighting between the forces of the extreme left and the extreme right," Isherwood, Spender, and other British nationals realized that they must flee the country. "There was a sensation of doom to be felt in the Berlin streets," Spender recalled.

By the time Adolf Hitler implemented the Enabling Act of 1933 which cemented his dictatorship, Isherwood, Ross, Spender, and others had fled Germany and returned to England. Many of the Berlin cabaret denizens befriended by Isherwood would later flee abroad or perish in concentration camps. These factual events served as the genesis for Isherwood's 1937 novella Sally Bowles which was later adapted into the 1955 film I Am a Camera and the 1966 Cabaret musical.

Production

Pre-production 
In July 1968, Cinerama made a verbal agreement to make a film version of the 1966 Broadway musical but pulled out in February 1969. In May 1969, Allied Artists paid a company record $1.5 million for the film rights and planned a company record budget. The cost of $4,570,000 was split evenly with ABC Pictures.

In 1971, Bob Fosse learned through Harold Prince, director of the original Broadway production, that Cy Feuer was producing a film adaptation of Cabaret through ABC Pictures and Allied Artists. This was the first film produced in the revival of Allied Artists. Determined to direct the film, Fosse begged Feuer to hire him. However, Fosse had previously directed the unsuccessful film adaptation of Sweet Charity, a box office failure which made chief executives Manny Wolf and Marty Baum reluctant to hire him. Wolf and Baum preferred a more renowned or established director such as Billy Wilder, Joseph L. Mankiewicz or Gene Kelly.

Eager to hire Fosse, Feuer appealed to the studio heads, citing Fosse's talent for staging and shooting musical numbers, adding that if inordinate attention was given to filming the book scenes at the expense of the musical numbers, the whole film could fail. Fosse ultimately was hired. Over the next months, Fosse met with previously hired screenwriter Jay Presson Allen to discuss the screenplay.

Screenplay revisions 
As production neared, Fosse became increasingly dissatisfied with Allen's script which was based on Joe Masteroff's original book of the stage version. Fosse hired Hugh Wheeler to rewrite and revise Allen's work. Wheeler was referred to as a "research consultant," and Allen retained screenwriting credit. Wheeler, a friend of Christopher Isherwood, knew that Isherwood had been critical of the stage musical due to its bowdlerizations of his material. Wheeler went back to Isherwood's original stories in order to ensure a more faithful adaptation of the source material. In particular, Wheeler restored the subplot about the gigolo and the Jewish heiress. Wheeler also drew on gay author Christopher Isherwood's openness about his homosexuality to make the leading male character a bisexual man "rather than the heterosexual as he had been in the stage musical."

Fosse decided to increase the focus on the Kit Kat Klub, where Sally performs, as a metaphor for the decadence of Germany in the 1930s by eliminating all but one of the musical numbers performed outside the club. The only remaining outside number is "Tomorrow Belongs to Me", a folk song rendered spontaneously by patrons at an open-air café in one of the film's most effective scenes. In addition, the show's original songwriters Kander and Ebb wrote two new songs, "Mein Herr" and "Money", and incorporated "Maybe This Time", a song they had composed in 1964 and first sung by Kaye Ballard.

Casting 

Feuer had cast Liza Minnelli as Sally Bowles and Joel Grey (reprising his stage role) long before Fosse was attached to the project. Fosse was given the option of using Grey as Master of Ceremonies or walking away from the production. Fosse hired Michael York as Sally Bowles's bisexual love interest, a casting choice which Minnelli initially believed was incorrect until she performed with him. Several smaller roles, as well as the remaining four dancers in the film, eventually were cast in West Germany.

Minnelli had auditioned to play Sally in the original Broadway production but was deemed too inexperienced at the time, even though she had won Broadway's Tony Award for Best Actress in a Musical. By the time Cabaret reached the screen, however, Minnelli was a film star having earned an Oscar nomination as the emotionally damaged college student in The Sterile Cuckoo (1969).

For her performance as Sally in the film, Minnelli reinterpreted the character and—at the explicit suggestion of her father, film and stage director Vincente Minnelli—she deliberately imitated film actress Louise Brooks, a flapper icon and sex symbol of the Jazz Age. Brooks, much like the character of Sally Bowles in the film, was an aspiring actress and American expat who temporarily moved to Weimar Berlin in search of international stardom. Minnelli later recalled:

In particular, Minnelli drew upon Brooks' "Lulu makeup and helmet-like coiffure." For the meeting between Sally Bowles and Brian Roberts, Minnelli modeled her movements and demeanor upon Brooks; in particular, the scene in Pandora's Box (1929) where Brooks' carefree character of Lulu is first introduced. Ultimately, Minnelli would win the Academy Award for Best Actress for her portrayal of Sally Bowles.

Filming 
Fosse and Feuer traveled to West Germany, where producers chose to shoot the film, in order to finish assembling the film crew. During this time, Fosse highly recommended Robert L. Surtees for cinematographer, but Feuer and the top executives saw Surtees's work on Sweet Charity as one of the film's many artistic problems. Producers eventually chose British cinematographer Geoffrey Unsworth. Designers Rolf Zehetbauer, Hans Jürgen Kiebach and Herbert Strabel served as production designers. Charlotte Flemming designed costumes. Dancers Kathryn Doby, Louise Quick and John Sharpe were brought on as Fosse's dance aides.

Rehearsals and filming took place entirely in West Germany. For reasons of economy, indoor scenes were shot at the Bavaria Film Studios in Grünwald, outside Munich. Prior to filming, Fosse would complain every afternoon on the set of Willy Wonka & the Chocolate Factory because that film was overrunning and keeping him from starting work on the same stage.

Narrative and news reading 
Although the songs throughout the film allude to and advance the narrative, every song except "Tomorrow Belongs to Me" is executed in the context of a Kit Kat Klub performance. The voice heard on the radio reading the news throughout the film in German was that of associate producer Harold Nebenzal, whose father Seymour Nebenzahl produced such notable Weimar films as M (1931), Testament of Dr. Mabuse (1933), and Threepenny Opera (1931).

Differences between film and stage version 
The film significantly differs from the Broadway musical. In the stage version, Sally is English (as she was in Isherwood's Goodbye to Berlin). In the film adaptation, she is American. Cliff Bradshaw was renamed Brian Roberts and made British (as was Isherwood, upon whom the character was based), rather than American as in the stage version. The characters and plotlines involving Fritz, Natalia and Max were pulled from I Am a Camera and did not appear in the stage production of Cabaret (or in Goodbye to Berlin).

The most significant change involves the excision of the two main characters: Fraulein Schneider, who runs a boarding house, and her love interest, Herr Schultz, a German grocer. Their doomed romance plot, and the consequences of a Gentile falling in love with a Jew during the rise of antisemitism was cut. With the removals were "So What?" and "What Would You Do", sung by Schneider, the song "Meeskite", sung by Schultz, and their two duets "It Couldn't Please Me More (The Pineapple Song)" (cut) and "Married" (reset as a piano instrumental, and a phonograph record), as well as a short reprise of "Married", sung alone by Schultz.

Kander and Ebb wrote several new songs and removed others. "Don't Tell Mama" was replaced by "Mein Herr", and "The Money Song" (retained in an instrumental version as "Sitting Pretty") was replaced by "Money, Money." "Mein Herr" and "Money, Money", which were composed for the film, were integrated into the stage musical alongside the original numbers. The song "Maybe This Time", which Sally performs at the cabaret, was not written for the film, but was intended for actress Kaye Ballard. Although "Don't Tell Mama" and "Married" were removed as performed musical numbers, both still appear in the film: "Mama"'s bridge section appears as an instrumental played on Sally's gramophone; "Married" initially plays on the piano in Fraulein Schneider's parlor, and later heard on Sally's gramophone in a German translation ("Heiraten") sung by cabaret singer Greta Keller. Additionally, "If You Could See Her", performed by the MC, originally concluded with the line "She wouldn't be meeskite at all" onstage. The film changes this to "She wouldn't look Jewish at all," a return to Ebb's original lyrics.

Soundtrack

Charts

Certifications

Reception

Box office

The film opened at the Ziegfeld Theatre in New York City on February 13, 1972 with a single performance benefit grossing $2,538. It started regular showings at the Ziegfeld from February 14, grossing $8,684 in its opening day, and a house record $80,278 for the week. It grossed another $165,038 from 6 other theatres in 6 key cities reported by Variety, placing it tenth at the US box office. After seven months of release, it had grossed $5.3 million in the New York metropolitan area. Variety estimated that this represented 30% of the film's total compared to the normal 15% for the market, one of the few big-budget films to perform much better in New York. Based on this estimate, the film had grossed around $17 million. By year end, Variety reported that it had earned theatrical rentals of $10,885,000, making it the eighth most successful film of the year. Following the film's success at the Academy Awards in March 1973, it reached number one at the US box office with a gross of $1,880,000 for the week, a record for Allied Artists. It remained number one for a second week. By May 1973, the film had earned rentals of $16 million in the United States and Canada and $7 million in other countries and reported a profit of $4,904,000. By the end of 1973, Variety had updated the film's rentals in the United States and Canada to $18,175,000.

Critical reception

Contemporary reviews 
Variety claimed the film received the most "sugary" reviews of the year. Roger Ebert gave a positive review in January 1972, saying: "This is no ordinary musical. Part of its success comes because it doesn't fall for the old cliché that musicals have to make you happy. Instead of cheapening the movie version by lightening its load of despair, director Bob Fosse has gone right to the bleak heart of the material and stayed there well enough to win an Academy Award for Best Director."

A.D. Murphy of Variety wrote "The film version of the 1966 John Kander-Fred Ebb Broadway musical Cabaret is most unusual: it is literate, bawdy, sophisticated, sensual, cynical, heart-warming, and disturbingly thought-provoking. Liza Minnelli heads a strong cast. Bob Fosse's generally excellent direction recreates the milieu of Germany some 40 years ago."

Roger Greenspun of The New York Times wrote in February 1972 that "Cabaret is one of those immensely gratifying imperfect works in which from beginning to end you can literally feel a movie coming to life." Likewise, Pauline Kael of The New Yorker wrote a review that same month in which she applauded the film:

Reaction of Isherwood and others 

Although Cabaret (1972) was well received by film critics upon its release, author Christopher Isherwood and other persons upon whom the film's characters were based were less receptive towards the cinematic adaptation. Isherwood himself was critical of the 1972 film due to what he perceived as its negative portrayal of homosexuality: 

Similarly, Isherwood's friend Jean Ross—upon whom the character of Sally Bowles was based—was ambivalent about the film. She felt the depiction of 1930s Berlin "was quite, quite different" from reality. Nevertheless, she conceded that the depiction of their social circle of British expatriates as pleasure-seeking libertines was accurate: "We were all utterly against the bourgeois standards of our parents' generation. That's what took us to [Weimar-era] Berlin. The climate was freer there." Such ambivalence towards Cabaret (1972) was not unique among Isherwood's circle.

The poet Stephen Spender lamented how Cabaret (1972) glossed over Weimar Berlin's crushing poverty:
 Both Spender and Ross contended that the 1972 film and 1966 Broadway musical deleteriously glamorized the harsh realities of the 1930s Weimar era.

Retrospective reviews 
In 2002, Jamie Russell of the BBC wrote that the film was "the first musical ever to be given an X certificate, Bob Fosse's Cabaret launched Liza Minnelli into Hollywood superstardom and re-invented the musical for the Age of Aquarius." In 2013, film critic Peter Bradshaw listed Cabaret at number one on his list of "Top 10 musicals", describing it as "satanically catchy, terrifyingly seductive...directed and choreographed with electric style by Bob Fosse...Cabaret is drenched in the sexiest kind of cynicism and decadent despair."

Controversies 
Although less explicit compared with other films made in the 1970s, Cabaret dealt explicitly with topics like corruption, sexual ambiguity, false dreams, and Nazism. Tim Dirks at Filmsite.org notes: "The sexually-charged, semi-controversial, kinky musical was the first one ever to be given an X rating (although later re-rated) with its numerous sexual flings and hedonistic club life. There was considerable sexual innuendo, profanity, casual sex talk (homosexual and heterosexual), some evidence of anti-Semitism, and even an abortion in the film." It was also rated X in the UK and later re-rated as 15.

On the topic of Nazism, there was little consensus among critics about the possibly fascist implications of the film and play. However, critic Steven Belletto wrote a critique of Cabaret in the Criticism journal, published by Wayne State University Press, in which he highlighted the anti-fascist themes in the film present both within and outside of the musical acts. According to Belletto, "despite the ways that the film has been understood by a variety of critics, [Cabaret] rejects the logic of fascist certainty by staging various numbers committed to irony and ambiguity."

The "Tomorrow Belongs to Me" scene was controversial, with Kander and Ebb, both of whom were Jewish, sometimes being wrongly accused of using a historical Nazi song. According to an article in Variety in November 1976, the film was censored in West Berlin when it was first released there theatrically, with the sequence featuring the Hitler Youth singing "Tomorrow Belongs to Me" having been deleted. This elimination was made "because of the feeling that it might stir up resentments in the audience by showing the sympathizers for the Nazi movement during the '30s." The sequence was restored, however, when the film was shown on West German television on November 7, 1976.

Another topic of discussion was the song "If You Could See Her", which closed with the line: "If you could see her through my eyes, she wouldn't look Jewish at all." The point of the song was showing anti-Semitism as it begins to run rampant in Berlin, but there were a number of Jewish groups who interpreted the lyrics differently.

Accolades 
Cabaret earned a total of 10 Academy Award nominations (winning 8 of them) and holds the record for most Academy Awards for a film that did not also win Best Picture.

Shortly before the Academy Awards, Bob Fosse won 2 Tony Awards for directing and choreographing Pippin, his biggest stage hit to date. Months later, he won the Primetime Emmy Award for choreographing and directing Liza Minnelli's television special Liza with a Z, he became the first director to win all three awards in one year.

American Film Institute recognition 
 AFI's 100 Years...100 Songs
 Cabaret – No. 18
 AFI's Greatest Movie Musicals – No. 5
 AFI's 100 Years...100 Movies (10th Anniversary Edition) – No. 63

National Film Registry 
Inducted into the National Film Registry in 1995 among a list of 25 Films that year.

Legacy 
Cabaret has been cited by TV Guide as among the greatest films made and in Movieline magazine as one of the "100 Best Movies Ever". It was included in Film4's "100 Greatest Films of All Time" at #78 and in The San Francisco Chronicles "Hot 100 Films of the Past", being hailed as "the last great musical. Liza Minnelli plays Sally Bowles, an American adrift in pre-Nazi Berlin, in Bob Fosse's stylish, near-perfect film."

David Benedict has written in The Guardian about Cabaret influence in musical films: "Back then, musicals were already low on film-goers' lists, so how come it was such a success? Simple: Cabaret is the musical for people who hate them. Given the vibrancy of its now iconic numbers – Liza Minnelli in bowler and black suspenders astride a bentwood chair belting out 'Mein Herr' or shimmying and shivering with pleasure over 'Money' with Joel Grey – it sounds strange to say it, but one of the chief reasons why Cabaret is so popular is that it's not shot like a musical."

The film has been listed as one of the most important for queer cinema for its depictions of bisexuality, arguably transgressive at the time of its 1972 post-Code release and has been credited with turning Liza Minnelli into a gay icon. Film blogs have selected it as "the gayest winner in the history of the Academy."

Home media 
The film was first released to DVD in 1998. There have been releases in 2003, 2008, and 2012. The film's international ancillary distribution rights are owned by ABC (now part of The Walt Disney Company), Fremantle (UK), Warner Bros. (which acquired the film as part of its purchase of Lorimar Productions, which had acquired the film library of Allied Artists) has US domestic distribution rights.

In April 2012, Warner unveiled a new restoration of the film at the TCM Classic Film Festival. A DigiBook edition was later released on Blu-ray on February 5, 2013. Before this restoration, Cabaret had been sold on a standard-definition DVD from Warner Bros., but the film was unavailable in high-definition or for digital projections in cinemas. The original camera negative is lost, and a surviving interpositive had a vertical scratch that ran through 1,000 feet, or 10 minutes, of one of its reels, as confirmed by Ned Price, vice president of mastering and restoration for Warner Bros. The damage ostensibly was inflicted by a grain of dirt that had rolled through the length of the reel, beginning with a scene in which Michael York's character confronts a pro-Nazi boarding house resident, and had cut into the emulsion. The marred frames were digitally restored, but "the difficult part was matching the grain structure so the fix was invisible." After automated digital repair attempts failed, the 1,000 feet of damaged film was hand painted using a computer stylus.

Warner Archive Collection reissued the Blu-ray on November 20, 2018, without the DigiBook.

See also 
 List of American films of 1972

Notes

References

Bibliography 
Francesco Mismirigo, Cabaret, un film allemand, Université de Genève, 1984

External links 

 Cabaret essay by Stephen Tropiano on the National Film Registry website
 Cabaret essay by Daniel Eagan in America's Film Legacy: The Authoritative Guide to the Landmark Movies in the National Film Registry, A&C Black, 2010 , pages 682-684
 
 
 
 
 
 

1970s musical drama films
1972 films
Allied Artists films
American LGBT-related films
American musical drama films
American historical musical films
Best Musical or Comedy Picture Golden Globe winners
Films that won the Best Original Score Academy Award
Bisexuality-related films
1970s English-language films
Films about writers
Films based on musicals
Films directed by Bob Fosse
Films featuring a Best Actress Academy Award-winning performance
Films featuring a Best Musical or Comedy Actress Golden Globe winning performance
Films featuring a Best Supporting Actor Academy Award-winning performance
Films featuring a Best Supporting Actor Golden Globe winning performance
Films set in Berlin
Films set in cabarets
Films set in 1931
Films that won the Best Sound Mixing Academy Award
Films whose art director won the Best Art Direction Academy Award
Films whose cinematographer won the Best Cinematography Academy Award
Films whose director won the Best Directing Academy Award
Films whose editor won the Best Film Editing Academy Award
Gay-related films
1970s German-language films
Liza Minnelli soundtracks
United States National Film Registry films
LGBT-related musical drama films
LGBT-related controversies in film
Best Film BAFTA Award winners
Films whose director won the Best Direction BAFTA Award
1972 LGBT-related films
1970s historical musical films
Films based on adaptations
Films shot at Bavaria Studios
Censored films
Male bisexuality in film
1972 drama films
1970s American films